Gary Catalano (30 October 1947 – 8 December 2002) was an Australian poet and art critic.

Life
Calatano was born on 30 October 1947 in Brisbane. He married writer Helen Hewitt in 1990. He died on 8 December 2002 in Melbourne.

Awards
 1992 Grace Leven Prize for Poetry (with Kevin Hart)
 1997 Australia Council's Keesing Studio in Paris residency
 2002 Harold White Fellowship from the National Library in Canberra

Bibliography

Poetry

Collections

List of poems

Short stories

Non-fiction
 The Years of Hope: Australian Art and Criticism, 1959-1968 1981
 The Bandaged Image: a study of artists' books, 1983
 An Intimate Australia: the landscape and recent Australian art, 1985

 Building a Picture: interviews with Australian artists, 1997
 The Solitary Watcher: Rick Amor and his Art, 2001

Anthologies

References
 review by Gig Ryan, The Age, 31 January 2004

    Obituary, The Age

1947 births
2002 deaths
20th-century Australian poets
Australian male poets
Quadrant (magazine) people
20th-century Australian male writers